"Miagete goran yoru no hoshi wo" (見上げてごらん夜の星を "Look up at the stars in the night") is a 1963 hit song performed by a Japanese singer Kyu Sakamoto. It was written by lyricist Rokusuke Ei and composer Taku Izumi. Izumi won the Japan Record Award. The song was originally written for a musical of the same title in 1960.

This song was covered by many singers, including BEGIN (as an end theme for the anime Futatsu no Spica) and Ken Hirai.

The song, among other cheerful songs of Kyu Sakamoto, was often heard in Japan after the 2011 Tōhoku earthquake and tsunami. This included a series of versions by 71 actors and singers (among which was Tommy Lee Jones), for Suntory beverage company commercials, coupled with the song  "Ue o Muite Arukō". Shikao Suga also covered the song for charity.

The lyrics start as follows:

見上げてごらん夜の星を  miagete goran yoru no hoshi wo (Look up at the stars in the sky)
小さな星の 小さな光りが chiisana hoshi no, chiisana hikari ga (The small light from a small star)
ささやかな幸せを　歌ってるsasayaka na shiawase wo utatteru (Is singing of a small happiness)

See also
 Melody Road, the pavement rendition of this song

References

1963 songs
Kyu Sakamoto songs
Japanese-language songs